Kiran Maheshwari (29 October 1961 – 30 November 2020) was an Indian politician from Rajasthan state, belonging to the Bharatiya Janata Party.

Biography
She served as Member of Parliament for Udaipur constituency in the 14th Lok Sabha (2004–2009). She lost the May 2009 election to the 15th Lok Sabha from Ajmer Lok Sabha constituency to Sachin Pilot of the Indian National Congress. She then contested the Rajasthan Legislative Assembly elections from Rajsamand assembly seat in December 2013 and won by a margin of over 30,000 votes. She retained the seat in the 2018 Assembly election.

She tested positive for COVID-19 in the fall of 2020, and died a month later, on 30 November, after being hospitalized for the past 21 days at Medanta hospital in Gurugram, Haryana.

References 

|-

External links
 

1961 births
2020 deaths
Bharatiya Janata Party politicians from Rajasthan
India MPs 2004–2009
Women members of the Rajasthan Legislative Assembly
Rajasthan MLAs 2013–2018
People from Rajsamand district
Lok Sabha members from Rajasthan
State cabinet ministers of Rajasthan
Politicians from Udaipur
21st-century Indian women politicians
21st-century Indian politicians
Women state cabinet ministers of India
Deaths from the COVID-19 pandemic in India
Women members of the Lok Sabha